The PSL Players' Player of the Season in South African football is awarded to the most outstanding player of the season. The award is decided by a vote of all the active footballers in the PSL.

References

Premier Soccer League trophies and awards